Callopistes is a lizard genus in the family Teiidae. It includes two extant species, which are native to Ecuador, Peru and Chile.

Species
Listed alphabetically.

Fossils

References

 
Lizard genera
Lizards of South America
Taxa named by Johann Ludwig Christian Gravenhorst